David Edward Fuller (July 28, 1941 – February 5, 2022) was an American politician from Montana.

Biography
Fuller was born in Helena, Montana, and graduated from Helena Senior High School. He attended the University of Montana. Fuller served on the Lewis and Clark County Commission and was a Democrat. He also served in the Montana Senate from 1983 to 1987.

He died in Helena on February 5, 2022, at age 80, with COVID-19-related symptoms.

References

1941 births
2022 deaths
Politicians from Helena, Montana
University of Montana alumni
Democratic Party Montana state senators
County commissioners in Montana
Deaths from the COVID-19 pandemic in Montana